This article is the third sub-division of Lists of Marylebone Cricket Club players. It presents an alphabetical listing of cricketers who debuted for Marylebone Cricket Club (MCC) in first-class cricket from the legalisation of overarm bowling in 1864 until the end of the 1894 season. Many of the players represented MCC after 1894 but they are only listed here, as it was in this period that they made their MCC debuts. Players who debuted for MCC before 1864 can be found in List of Marylebone Cricket Club players (1827–1863). 1894 was the last full season before the official definition of first-class cricket was implemented in May 1895.

MCC played all its home matches through the period at its own Lord's venue in north London. Although some players who represented the club were members or ground staff, most were associated with county clubs and appeared for MCC by invitation. MCC teams have always operated at all levels of the sport and players who represented the club in minor cricket only are out of scope here. At this time, MCC had not taken control of overseas tours by the England cricket team and had yet to play any matches outside Great Britain (the first was a visit to Ireland in 1895).

The details are the player's usual name followed by the span of years in which he was active as an MCC player in important matches (the span may include years in which he played in minor matches only for MCC and/or years in which he did not represent MCC in any matches) and then his name is given as it would appear on modern match scorecards (e.g., surname preceded by all initials), followed by the county club or other team with which he was mostly associated (this may be MCC itself). A handful of these players later travelled abroad on winter tours organised by MCC from 1903/04: dates and destinations are given at the end of each relevant entry. Players who took part in early Test cricket, which began in 1877, have their names highlighted in bold text.

A
 Robert Abdy (1888) : R. B. Abdy (MCC)
 Archibald Acheson (1864) : Lord A. B. S. Acheson (MCC)
 Edward Acheson (1866) : E. A. B. Acheson (MCC)
 Bayly Akroyd (1879) : B. N. Akroyd (Surrey)
 Charles Allcock (1883) : C. H. Allcock (Cambridge University)
 Frederic Allsopp (1884) : F. E. Allsopp (MCC)
 Josceline Amherst (1866) : J. G. H. Amherst (MCC)
 Percy Amherst (1871) : P. A. Amherst (MCC)
 Alexander Anstruther (1873–1887) : A. W. Anstruther (Sussex)
 Arthur Appleby (1874) : A. Appleby (Lancashire)
 J. Archdale (1876) : J. Archdale (MCC)
 Henry Arkwright (1864–1866) : H. Arkwright (Cambridge University)
 Henry Armitstead (1864) : S. H. Armitstead (MCC)
 William Armitstead (1864) : W. G. Armitstead (MCC)
 Harry Arnall-Thompson (1887) : H. T. Arnall-Thompson (Oxford University)
 William Attewell (1883–1900) : W. Attewell (Nottinghamshire)

B
 Herbert Bainbridge (1883–1887) : H. W. Bainbridge (Surrey)
 John Bainbridge (1882) : J. H. Bainbridge
 Matthew Baines (1884–1890) : M. T. Baines
 Francis Baker (1868–1875) : F. Baker (Gloucestershire)
 Robert Drummond Balfour (1865–1873) : R. D. Balfour
 Leslie Balfour-Melville (1892) : L. M. Balfour-Melville
 Alan Barnes (1877–1879) : A. S. Barnes (Derbyshire)
 Billy Barnes (1879–1894) : W. Barnes (Nottinghamshire)
 Ted Barratt (1872) : E. D. Barratt
 Robert Bartholomew (1872) : R. Bartholomew 
 Hamar Alfred Bass (1865) : H. A. Bass
 William Bather (1883) : W. H. Bather (CUCC)
 George Bean (1890–1898) : G. Bean (Sussex)
 Arthur Becher (1872) : A. W. R. Becher (MCC)
 Russell Bencraft (1881–1885) : H. W. R. Bencraft (Hampshire)
 Ferdinando Bennet (1878) : F. W. Bennet (Kent)
 William Betts (1866) : W. H. Betts
 George Bird (1874–1878) : G. Bird (Middlesex)
 Walter Bird (1880) : W. Bird
 William Blacker (1876) : W. Blacker (CUCC)
 Joseph Blundell (1882) : J. W. Blundell
 Jack Board (1892–1909) : J. H. Board (Gloucestershire). Tours: South Africa (1905/06).
 Francis Bohlen (1894–1904) : F. H. Bohlen (Philadelphia, London County)
 Clement Booth (1871–1886) : C. Booth (Hampshire)
 Lionel Booth (1885) : L. E. B. Booth (MCC)
 Farrington Boult (1873) : F. H. Boult (Surrey)
 Walter Bovill (1874) : W. D. Bovill (MCC)
 Courtenay Boyle (1866–1872) : C. E. Boyle (Oxford University)
 William Brain (1891) : W. H. Brain (Oxford University)
 Thomas Bramwell (1875) : T. Y. Bramwell (MCC)
 Edward Bray (1877–1879) : E. Bray (Surrey)
 William Bridgeman, 1st Viscount Bridgeman (1888–1894) : W. C. Bridgeman (Cambridge University)
 Thomas Brindley (1867) : T. Brindley (MCC)
 John Brockbank (1874) : J. B. Brockbank
 Thomas Brown (1894–1901) : T. A. Brown
 Charles Brune (1868–1875) : C. J. Brune (Middlesex)
 Edward Buckland (1885) : E. H. Buckland
 Francis Buckland (1891) : F. M. Buckland (Middlesex, OUCC)
 Henry Bull (1864–1876) : H. E. Bull (OUCC)
 Charles Buller (1865–1877) : C. F. Buller (Middlesex)
 Charles Bulpett (1877–1882) : C. W. L. Bulpett (Middlesex)
 Charles Burke (1882) : C. C. Burke (MCC)
 Henry Burnell (1879) : H. B. Burnell (MCC)
 James Burns (1890–1901) : J. Burns
 George Burton (1883–1892) : G. Burton
 Edward Butler (1877) : E. H. Butler
 Cyril Buxton (1889–1891) : C. D. Buxton
 John Byass (1876) : J. E. Byass (Kent)

C
 Frederick Campbell (1868–1869) : F. Campbell 
 Frederick Capron (1881–1882) : F. W. Capron
 John Carlin (1888–1901) : J. Carlin
 Herbert Carpenter (1893–1906) : H. A. Carpenter (Essex)
 John Carrick (1882) : J. Carrick 
 Arthur Carter (1885) : A. Carter
 Thomas Case (1868–1869) : T. Case (Middlesex)
 Leathley Chater (1881) : L. Chater 
 William Chatterton (1886–1899) : W. Chatterton
 Stanley Christopherson (1885) : S. Christopherson (Kent)
 Smith Churchill (1865) : S. W. Churchill
 William Churchill (1870–1872) : W. Churchill
 Charles Clarke (1877–1885) : C. F. C. Clarke (Surrey)
 Robert Clayton (1872–1881) : R. O. Clayton (Yorkshire)
 Lord Clifton (1873–1880) : Lord Clifton (Kent)
 Frank Cobden (1870–1872) : F. C. Cobden (Cambridge University)
 Bransby Cooper (1867–1869) : B. B. Cooper (Kent)
 John Cooper (1881) : J. F. Cooper 
 Charles Coote (1869–1874) : C. P. Coote 
 Robert Copland-Crawford (1872–1873) : R. E. W. Copland-Crawford
 George Cotterill (1890) : G. H. Cotterill
 Clement Cottrell (1877–1883) : C. E. Cottrell (Middlesex)
 Henry Coventry (1888) : H. T. Coventry 
 Edmund Craigie (1870) : E. W. Craigie
 James Cranston (1891) : J. Cranston
 Frank Fairbairn Crawford (1880–1884) : F. F. Crawford
 Henry Crawley (1887) : H. E. Crawley
 William Crawley (1867) : W. P. Crawley 
 John Cressy-Hall (1873–1880) : J. W. Cressy-Hall (MCC)
 Frederick Crooke (1874–1875) : F. J. Crooke (Gloucestershire)
 Frederick Crowder (1874) : F. Crowder (Gentlemen of England)
 James Crowdy (1872) : J. G. Crowdy
 Percy Crutchley (1877) : P. E. Crutchley
 Frederick Currie (1894) : F. A. Currie
 Edward Curteis (1887) : E. W. Curteis
 Herbert Curteis (1874–1880) : H. Curteis
 Robert Curteis (1880–1881) : R. M. Curteis

D
 Lewis D'Aeth (1894) : L. N. H. D'Aeth 
 Richard Daft (1883) : R. Daft (Nottinghamshire)
 John Dale (1869–1882) : J. W. Dale (Middlesex)
 Earl of Dalkeith (1881–1885) : Earl of Dalkeith (MCC)
 George Davenport (1885–1896) : G. Davenport (Cheshire)
 John Davey (1874–1876) : J. G. Davey
 George Davidson (1888–1898) : G. A. Davidson
 John Davidson (1864) : J. E. Davidson
 Leslie Davidson (1877) : W. L. Davidson
 G. A. Dawson (1871) : G. A. Dawson (Gentlemen of the South)
 Harry de Paravicini (1882–1885) : H. F. de Paravicini (MCC)
 Percy de Paravicini (1883–1889) : P. J. de Paravicini
 Charles de Trafford (1889–1911/12) : C. E. de Trafford (Leicestershire). Tours: New Zealand (1906/07); South America (1911/12).
 Francis Disney-Roebuck (1878–1882) : F. H. A. Disney-Roebuck (MCC)
 George Dodsworth (1868) : G. E. Dodsworth 
 Adam Duncan (1873–1879) : A. S. D. Duncan (Cambridge University)
 John Dunn (1882) : J. Dunn
 Theodore Dury (1877) : T. S. Dury
 Edwin Dyke (1866) : E. F. Dyke (Cambridge University)

E
 Hubert Eaton (1887–1894) : H. F. J. Eaton
 William Eccles (1866–1867) : W. H. Eccles
 Tom Emmett (1885–1886) : T. Emmett (Yorkshire)
 Alfred Evans (1882–1885) : A. H. Evans
 William Evetts (1870–1882) : W. Evetts
 Christopher Ewbank (1866) : C. C. Ewbank
 John Eyre (1887) : J. Eyre

F
 Frank Farrands (1868–1880) : F. H. Farrands (Nottinghamshire)
 James Fellowes (1870) : J. Fellowes
 J. J. Ferris (1891–1894) : J. J. Ferris
 Charles Filgate (1869–1873) : C. R. Filgate (Gloucestershire)
 Heneage Finch, 6th Earl of Aylesford (1866) : H. R. Finch
 Alfred Fitzgerald (1868) : A. W. Fitzgerald
 Francis Fitzgerald (1890) : F. J. Fitzgerald 
 Maurice Purcell-FitzGerald (1866) : M. N. R. P. Fitzgerald
 Michael Flanagan (1876–1877) : M. Flanagan (Middlesex)
 Wilfred Flowers (1878–1895) : W. Flowers (Nottinghamshire)
 Cyril Foley (1888–1906) : C. P. Foley
 Charles Foley (1891) : C. W. Foley (Cambridge University)
 Paul Foley (1891) : P. H. Foley (Worcestershire)
 George Foljambe (1879–1882) : G. S. Foljambe (Nottinghamshire)
 Godfrey Foljambe (1892–1893) : G. A. T. Foljambe (MCC)
 Edward Follett (1868) : E. C. Follett
 William Foord-Kelcey (1878) : W. Foord-Kelcey (Kent)
 Augustus Ford (1880–1881) : A. F. J. Ford (Middlesex)
 Francis Ford (1893–1899) : F. G. J. Ford
 William Justice Ford (1881–1896) : W. J. Ford
 Henry Forster, 1st Baron Forster (1887–1888) : H. W. Forster
 Arnold Fothergill (1882–1886) : A. J. Fothergill
 Thomas Fowler (1864–1867) : T. F. Fowler (Cambridge University)
 Gerald Fowler (1890–1891) : G. Fowler
 Howard Fowler (1884) : H. Fowler
 William Herbert Fowler (1880–1885) : W. H. Fowler
 Charles Francis (1874–1879) : C. K. Francis (Middlesex)
 John Frederick (1866–1869) : J. S. Frederick (Hampshire)
 Lovick Friend (1891) : L. B. Friend
 C. B. Fry (1893) : C. B. Fry
 Douglas Fyfe (1866–1869) : D. M. Fyfe

G
 William Game (1883) : W. H. Game (Surrey)
 Herbert Gardner (1882) : H. W. Gardner 
 Leslie Gay (1894–1904) : L. H. Gay
 Frederic Geeson (1892–1902) : F. Geeson
 Joseph Gibbs (1894–1896) : J. A. Gibbs
 Arthur Gibson (1892–1896) : A. B. E. Gibson
 Hugh Gillett (1868) : H. H. Gillett
 James Gowans (1891) : J. Gowans
 E. M. Grace (1865–1868) : E. M. Grace (Gloucestershire)
 W. G. Grace (1869–1904) : W. G. Grace (Gloucestershire)
 W. G. Grace junior (1894–1895) : W. G. Grace junior
 Joseph Greatorex (1882–1884) : J. E. A. Greatorex (MCC)
 Theophilus Greatorex (1885–1887) : T. Greatorex
 Charles Green (1869–1880) : C. E. Green
 Joseph Green (1870) : J. F. Green
 William Green (1880–1884) : W. B. Green 
 Frederick Greenfield (1874–1883) : F. F. J. Greenfield (Sussex)
 Charles Greenwood (1875) : C. W. Greenwood
 Algernon Griffiths (1871–1873) : A. S. Griffiths (Middlesex)
 Herbert Griffiths (1876–1878) : H. T. Griffiths 
 William Gunn (1881–1900) : W. Gunn (Nottinghamshire)

H
 Edward Hadow (1883–1890) : E. M. Hadow
 Frank Hadow (1874) : P. F. Hadow (Middlesex)
 Walter Hadow (1871–1884) : W. H. Hadow (Middlesex)
 Richard Halliwell (1866–1873) : R. B. Halliwell (Middlesex)
 Leonard Hamilton (1893) : L. A. H. Hamilton (Kent)
 Lord George Hamilton (1864) : Lord G. F. Hamilton
 William Hamilton (1883) : W. D. Hamilton
 T. P. Hanbury (1882) : T. P. Hanbury
 Reginald Hargreaves (1876–1878) : R. G. Hargreaves (Hampshire)
 Lord Harris (1875–1895) : Lord Harris (Kent)
 John Hartley (1878) : J. D. Hartley 
 Alfred Hastings (1869) : A. G. Hastings
 Lord Hawke (1884–1911/12) : Lord Hawke. Tours: South America (1911/12).
 Edward Hawtrey (1880–1882) : E. M. Hawtrey
 George Hay (1882) : G. Hay (Derbyshire)
 William Hay (1877) : W. H. Hay
 Francis Head (1881) : F. S. Head
 William Hearn (1878–1891) : W. Hearn (South)
 Alec Hearne (1888–1910) : A. Hearne
 Frank Hearne (1882–1889) : F. Hearne
 G. F. Hearne (1882) : G. F. Hearne
 G. G. Hearne (1877–1903) : G. G. Hearne (Kent)
 J. T. Hearne (1891–1921) : J. T. Hearne
 Sir James Heath, 1st Baronet (1882–1910/11) : J. Heath. Tours: West Indies (1910/11).
 Arthur Heath (1876–1894) : A. H. Heath (Middlesex)
 Coote Hedley (1890–1893) : W. C. Hedley
 Augustus Hemming (1874–1878) : A. W. L. Hemming
 Perceval Henery (1885–1893) : P. J. T. Henery (Middlesex)
 Allen Herbert (1872–1876) : A. H. W. Herbert (Middlesex)
 Christopher Heseltine (1892–1914) : C. Heseltine
 Herbie Hewett (1888–1896) : H. T. Hewett
 John Hibbert (1881–1882) : J. C. Hibbert
 William Higgins (1870–1873) : W. C. Higgins
 Ledger Hill (1893–1911/12) : A. J. L. Hill. Tours: South America (1911/12).
 Frederick Hill (1871) : F. H. Hill (OUCC)
 Henry Hill (1880–1883) : H. J. Hill
 Robert Hills (1867–1876) : R. S. Hills
 George Hillyard (1891–1895) : G. W. Hillyard
 Philip Hilton (1874) : P. Hilton
 Trevitt Hine-Haycock (1886) : T. R. Hine-Haycock (Kent)
 Charles Hoare (1878) : C. T. Hoare
 Henry Hoare (1867) : H. W. Hoare
 Alfred Holt (1883) : A. Holt (Gentlemen of England)
 Leland Hone (1878–1880) : L. Hone
 William Hone (1864–1877) : W. Hone
 William Hood (1875–1880) : W. N. Hood
 Fraser Hore (1866) : F. S. Hore
 A. N. Hornby (1873–1898) : A. N. Hornby (Lancashire)
 John Horner (1867) : J. F. F. Horner
 John Hornsby (1892–1898) : J. H. J. Hornsby (Middlesex)
 Frederick Hotham (1883) : F. W. Hotham
 Charles Hough (1883) : C. H. Hough 
 Leonard Howell (1875) : L. S. Howell
 George Howitt (1872) : G. Howitt (Middlesex)
 John Hulme (1889) : J. J. Hulme
 Charles Hulse (1885) : C. W. Hulse 
 Edward Hume (1867) : E. Hume (OUCC)
 James Husey-Hunt (1878) : J. H. Husey-Hunt
 William Hutchinson (1869) : W. F. M. Hutchinson
 Henry Hyndman (1865) : H. M. Hyndman (Sussex)

I
 Alfred Inglis (1885) : A. M. Inglis
 Arthur Ireland (1881) : A. Ireland 
 Francis Isherwood (1872) : F. W. R. Isherwood (Oxford University)

J
 Stanley Jackson (1894–1905) : F. S. Jackson (Yorkshire)
 James Jardine (1870–1874) : J. Jardine 
 Lewis Jarvis (1879) : L. K. Jarvis (Cambridge University)
 Arthur Frederick Jeffreys (1872–1879) : A. F. Jeffreys (Hampshire)
 Edward Jobson (1891) : E. P. Jobson
 Richard Jones (1884–1885) : R. S. Jones (Kent)

K
 Sir Kenneth Hagar Kemp, 12th Baronet (1872–1873) : K. H. Kemp (Cambridge University)
 Charles Kemp (1878) : C. W. M. Kemp (Kent)
 Arthur Kemp (1885) : A. F. Kemp
 George Kemp, 1st Baron Rochdale (1894–1898) : G. Kemp
 Manley Kemp (1885–1888) : M. C. Kemp
 Matthews Kempson (1865) : S. M. E. Kempson
 William Kenyon-Slaney (1869–1880) : W. S. Kenyon-Slaney
 Kingsmill Key (1888–1908) : K. J. Key
 Richard Key (1866) : R. L. T. Key
 Henry Kingscote (1868–1878) : H. B. Kingscote (Gloucestershire)
 Sidney Kitcat (1890–1891) : S. A. P. Kitcat
 Charles Kortright (1893) : C. J. Kortright

L
 Francis Lacey (1887–1896) : F. E. Lacey
 Oswald Lancashire (1882–1886) : O. P. Lancashire (Lancashire)
 Alfred Langhorne (1880) : A. R. M. Langhorne
 Henry Langley (1866) : H. F. J. Langley
 Thomas Latham (1874) : T. Latham (Cambridge University)
 George Law (1879–1881) : G. Law (Middlesex)
 William Law (1873–1882) : W. Law
 Reginald le Bas (1882) : R. V. le Bas
 Philip Le Gros (1921–1922) : P. W. le Gros (Minor Counties)
 Henry Leaf (1884) : H. M. Leaf
 Gerald Leatham (1876–1882) : G. A. B. Leatham (Yorkshire)
 Albert Leatham (1886–1897) : A. E. Leatham
 Vernon Leese (1892–1897) : V. F. Leese (Cambridge University)
 William Leese (1889–1890) : W. H. Leese 
 Charles Leslie (1882) : C. F. H. Leslie (Middlesex)
 William Legge, 6th Earl of Dartmouth (1877) : Viscount Lewisham
 Herbert Littlewood (1887–1896) : H. D. Littlewood
 Willie Llewelyn (1893) : W. D. Llewelyn (Oxford University)
 Edward Lloyd (1868) : E. W. M. Lloyd (Cambridge University)
 Henry Long (1880) : H. J. Long
 George Longman (1877–1881) : G. H. Longman (Hampshire)
 Arthur Luard (1893) : A. J. H. Luard
 Alfred Lubbock (1866–1869) : A. Lubbock (Kent)
 A. P. Lucas (1880–1906) : A. P. Lucas (Surrey)
 Morton Lucas (1881–1887) : M. P. Lucas (Sussex)
 Alfred Lucas (1880) : A. G. Lucas
 Robert Slade Lucas (1894–1895) : R. S. Lucas
 Alfred Lyttelton (1877–1881) : A. Lyttelton (Middlesex)
 Edward Lyttelton (1878–1879) : E. Lyttelton (Middlesex)
 Arthur Lyttelton (1872) : A. T. Lyttelton
 Robert Lyttelton (1873–1874) : R. H. Lyttelton

M
 Gregor MacGregor (1888–1907) : G. MacGregor. Tours: North America (1907).
 William Mackeson (1883) : W. J. Mackeson
 Montague MacLean (1893) : M. F. MacLean
 Reginald Maitland (1885) : R. P. Maitland
 William Fuller-Maitland (1866–1870) : W. F. Maitland
 William Maitland (1868–1869) : W. J. Maitland
 James Mansfield (1883–1888) : J. W. Mansfield (Cambridge University)
 Frank Marchant (1890–1896) : F. Marchant (Kent)
 Charles Marriott (1870) : C. Marriott (Oxford University)
 Thomas Roger Marshall (1884–1886) : T. R. Marshall
 William Marten (1869) : W. G. Marten (Kent)
 George Marten (1864–1869) : G. N. Marten (Gentlemen of England)
 Frederick Martin (1886–1900) : F. Martin
 John Stapleton Martin (1871)
 John Newton Martin (1891) : J. N. Martin
 Sidney Martin (1871) : J. S. Martin
 Marcus Martin (1865) : M. T. Martin
 Lionel Martineau (1888) : L. Martineau (Cambridge University)
 Philip Martineau (1883) : P. H. Martineau
 Frederick Maude (1883–1897) : F. W. Maude (Middlesex)
 John Maude (1873) : J. Maude (Oxford University)
 Wellwood Maxwell (1890) : W. Maxwell 
 Edmund Maynard (1883–1887) : E. A. J. Maynard
 Ronald McNeill, 1st Baron Cushendun (1885) : R. J. McNeill
 Walter Mead (1892–1911) : W. Mead (Essex)
 George Meares (1876) : G. B. Meares 
 Jack Mee (1894) : R. J. Mee (Nottinghamshire)
 Henry Meek (1878) : H. E. Meek 
 Frank Mellor (1878) : F. H. Mellor (Kent)
 Leonard Micklem (1869) : L. Micklem 
 George "Bay" Middleton (1870–1880) : W. G. Middleton
 Billy Midwinter (1880–1882) : W. E. Midwinter (Gloucestershire)
 Audley Miles (1876) : A. C. Miles
 Roger Miller (1881–1884) : R. Miller (Cambridge University)
 Francis Miller (1877) : F. S. Miller
 William Miller (1876) : W. H. Miller
 Henry Mills (1881) : H. M. Mills (Middlesex)
 George Milman (1868–1869) : G. A. Milman 
 George Mirehouse (1887–1896) : G. T. Mirehouse
 Mike Mitchell (1878–1883) : R. A. H. Mitchell
 Walter Money (1868–1869) : W. B. Money (Surrey)
 Victor Montagu (1868–1869) : V. A. Montagu
 Henry Montgomery (1868) : H. H. Montgomery
 Francis Montresor (1880) : W. F. Montresor 
 William Moore (1870) : W. F. P. Moore (Gentlemen of England)
 Robert Moorhouse (1891–1900) : R. Moorhouse (Yorkshire)
 Osbert Mordaunt (1866) : O. Mordaunt 
 Fred Morley (1874–1883) : F. Morley (Nottinghamshire)
 Norman Morris (1873) : N. Morris (Surrey)
 Huson Morris (1868) : H. Morris 
 Reginald Moss (1893) : R. H. Moss (Liverpool & District)
 Kenneth Muir Mackenzie, 1st Baron Muir Mackenzie (1870) : K. A. Muir-Mackenzie
 George Mumford (1867) : G. Mumford (Middlesex)
 Billy Murdoch (1891–1902) : W. L. Murdoch
 Thomas Mycroft (1878–1887) : T. Mycroft (Derbyshire)
 William Mycroft (1876–1886) : W. Mycroft (Derbyshire)

N
 Duncan Napier (1892) : D. R. Napier 
 Frank Needham (1891–1901) : F. Needham (Nottinghamshire)
 Augustus Nepean (1876–1877) : A. A. S. Nepean (Middlesex)
 Evan Nepean (1886–1902) : E. A. Nepean
 Stephen Newton (1885–1890) : S. C. Newton (Middlesex)
 Henry Nixon (1873) : H. Nixon
 Frederick Norley (1865) : F. Norley (Kent)

O
 T. C. O'Brien (1883–1905) : T. C. O'Brien (Middlesex)
 Edward O'Shaughnessy (1880–1883) : E. O'Shaughnessy (Kent)
 Cuthbert Ottaway (1876) : C. J. Ottaway (Middlesex)
 Hugh Owen (1885) : H. G. P. Owen (Essex)

P
 Herbert Page (1886) : H. V. Page
 Henry Palairet (1868–1869) : H. H. Palairet
 Elliot Parke (1879–1884) : E. A. Parke (South)
 John Parnham (1883–1889) : J. T. Parnham (United Eleven)
 Bernard Pauncefote (1871) : B. Pauncefote (Middlesex)
 Clement Pavey (1882) : C. S. Pavey 
 Alfred Payne (1883–1884) : A. E. Payne (N/A)
 Thomas Pearce (1874–1876) : T. A. Pearce (South)
 Thomas Pearson (1873–1890) : T. S. Pearson (Middlesex)
 Francis Pelham, 5th Earl of Chichester (1868) : F. G. Pelham (Sussex)
 Francis Pember (1882–1885) : F. W. Pember (Hampshire)
 Frank Penn (1876–1881) : F. Penn (Kent)
 William Penn (1874) : W. Penn
 John Pennycuick (1883) : J. Pennycuick
 John Pentecost (1887) : J. H. Pentecost (Kent)
 Hylton Philipson (1889–1897) : H. Philipson
 Jim Phillips (1888–1893) : J. Phillips (Middlesex, Victoria)
 Herbert Phipps (1865) : H. G. Phipps
 Harry Pickett (1884–1898) : H. Pickett
 Charles Pigg (1887–1901) : C. Pigg
 Herbert Pigg (1893) : H. Pigg
 Dick Pilling (1879–1883) : R. Pilling (Lancashire)
 John Platts (1870) : J. T. B. D. Platts
 John Ponsonby-Fane (1869) : J. H. Ponsonby-Fane
 Dudley Pontifex (1883–1896) : D. D. Pontifex
 Charles Pope (1894) : C. G. Pope (Cambridge University)
 Roland Pope (1889–1891) : R. J. Pope
 Dick Pougher (1887–1902) : A. D. Pougher
 Ernest Powell (1888–1895) : E. O. Powell
 Walter Powys (1877–1879) : W. N. Powys (Hampshire)
 Walter Price (1868–1882) : W. Price (Nottinghamshire)

Q
 Francis Quinton (1893–1895) : F. W. D. Quinton (Hampshire)

R
 Francis Ramsay (1894) : M. F. Ramsay (Queensland)
 Frederick Randon (1874–1876) : F. Randon (Players of the North, North)
 Ranjitsinhji (1894–1912) : Ranjitsinhji
 Harry Ravenhill (1882) : E. H. G. Ravenhill
 John Rawlin (1887–1909) : J. T. Rawlin
 Walter Read (1890) : W. W. Read
 Farrant Reed (1882) : H. F. Reed
 Henry Renny-Tailyour (1875) : H. W. Renny-Tailyour (Kent)
 Alfred Renshaw (1871) : A. G. Renshaw 
 Herbert Rhodes (1878–1883) : H. E. Rhodes (Yorkshire)
 William Richards (1866) : W. H. Richards
 Henry Richardson (1869–1870) : H. A. Richardson (Middlesex)
 Henry Richardson (1890–1894) : H. Richardson (Nottinghamshire)
 John Maunsell Richardson (1874) : J. M. Richardson
 Richard Richardson (1876–1877) : R. T. Richardson
 George Ricketts (1892–1902) : G. W. Ricketts
 Edward Riddell (1870–1871) : E. M. H. Riddell
 Arthur Ridley (1875–1882) : A. W. Ridley (Hampshire)
 James Robertson (1880–1892) : J. Robertson (Middlesex)
 John Robinson (1889–1896) : J. S. Robinson (Nottinghamshire)
 John Robinson (1893) : J. J. Robinson
 Charles Robson (1883) : C. Robson
 William Rodwell (1882) : W. H. Rodwell
 William Rose (1867) : W. M. Rose 
 Hamilton Ross (1879–1889) : H. Ross
 Hugh Rotherham (1884) : H. Rotherham
 James Round (1865–1869) : J. Round
 William Rowell (1891) : W. I. Rowell (Cambridge University)
 Charles Rowley (1870–1879) : C. R. Rowley (Middlesex)
 Vernon Royle (1878) : V. P. F. A. Royle (Lancashire)
 Harold Ruggles-Brise (1884) : H. G. Ruggles-Brise
 John Russel (1875–1891) : J. S. Russel (South)
 Patrick Russel (1894) : P. Russel 
 Edward Rutter (1869–1874) : E. Rutter (Middlesex)
 Arnold Rylott (1872–1888) : A. Rylott

S
 Ted Sainsbury (1883–1884) : E. Sainsbury (Somerset)
 Edward Salmon (1879) : E. H. P. Salmon (Middlesex)
 Lancelot Sanderson (1888) : L. Sanderson (Lancashire)
 John Sandford (1869) : J. D. Sandford (Oxford University)
 James Henry Savory (1879–1883) : J. H. Savory (Oxford University)
 Sandford Schultz (1881–1884) : S. S. Schultz (Lancashire)
 Lord George Scott (1886–1905) : G. W. Scott (MCC)
 Stanley Scott (1889) : S. W. Scott (Middlesex)
 William Scotton (1881–1891) : W. H. Scotton (Nottinghamshire)
 Charles Seymour (1879) : C. R. Seymour (Hampshire)
 Frank Shacklock (1889–1893) : F. J. Shacklock (Nottinghamshire)
 Francis Shadwell (1880–1881) : F. B. Shadwell (Surrey)
 Alfred Shaw (1865–1881) : A. Shaw (Nottinghamshire)
 Mordecai Sherwin (1878–1895) : M. Sherwin (Nottinghamshire)
 Charles Showers (1881) : C. J. Showers (MCC)
 John Shuter (1881–1893) : J. Shuter (Surrey)
 Leonard Shuter (1878) : L. A. Shuter (Surrey)
 Arthur Smith (1875) : A. F. Smith (Middlesex)
 C. Aubrey Smith (1886) : C. A. Smith (Sussex)
 Charles Smith (1867–1878) : C. J. Smith (Middlesex)
 Ernest Smith (1892–1902) : E. Smith (Yorkshire)
 John Smith (1871–1872) : J. Smith (Cambridgeshire)
 A. H. Smith-Barry (1873–1875) : A. H. Smith-Barry (MCC)
 Harry Smith-Turberville (1886) : H. T. Smith-Turberville (MCC)
 John Smythe (1878–1885) : J. W. Smythe (MCC)
 Francis Speed (1882–1884) : F. E. Speed
 James Spens (1886–1888) : J. Spens (Hampshire)
 Douglas Spiro (1883–1890) : D. G. Spiro (Cambridge University)
 Fred Spofforth (1890–1897) : F. R. Spofforth (Derbyshire)
 Thomas Spyers (1890) : T. R. Spyers (MCC)
 Harry Stedman (1871) : H. C. P. Stedman (Cambridge University)
 A. G. Steel (1880–1890) : A. G. Steel (Lancashire)
 Douglas Steel (1881) : D. Q. Steel (Lancashire)
 Frederick Steele (1879–1880) : F. Steele (Middlesex)
 Herbert Stewart (1869) : H. Stewart (Hampshire)
 Andrew Stoddart (1887–1900) : A. E. Stoddart (Middlesex)
 Charles Stone (1894–1896) : C. C. Stone (Leicestershire)
 Bill Storer (1893–1904) : W. Storer (Derbyshire)
 William Story (1883) : W. F. Story (Nottinghamshire)
 Montague Stow (1867) : M. H. Stow (Cambridge University)
 George Strachan (1872–1878) : G. Strachan (Gloucestershire)
 Alfred Stratford (1878–1880) : A. H. Stratford (Middlesex)
 Edward Streatfeild (1890) : E. C. Streatfeild (Surrey)
 Arthur Studd (1887–1888) : A. H. Studd (MCC)
 Charles Studd (1881–1884) : C. T. Studd (Middlesex)
 Edward Studd (1879–1886) : E. J. C. Studd (MCC)
 George Studd (1879–1885) : G. B. Studd (Middlesex)
 Herbert Studd (1890–1895) : H. W. Studd (Middlesex)
 Kynaston Studd (1880–1885) : J. E. K. Studd (Middlesex)
 Reginald Studd (1894) : R. A. Studd (Hampshire)
 Edmund Sutton (1864–1873) : E. G. G. Sutton (Middlesex)
 William Swain (1864) : W. Swain (MCC)
 Charles Sykes (1890) : C. P. Sykes

T
 Thomas Tapling (1886) : T. K. Tapling
 Hector Tennent (1865–1872) : H. N. Tennent (Lancashire)
 Charles Thornton (1869–1895) : C. I. Thornton (Kent)
 Richard Thornton (1881–1893) : R. T. Thornton (Kent)
 Albert Thornton (1879) : A. J. Thornton
 Walter Thornton (1883) : W. A. Thornton (Oxford University)
 Charles Thring (1889) : C. H. M. Thring 
 Valentine Titchmarsh (1885–1891) : V. A. Titchmarsh
 Frederic Tobin (1870) : F. Tobin (Cambridge University)
 Robert Tomkinson (1873) : R. E. Tomkinson 
 Charles Toppin (1891) : C. Toppin
 William Townshend (1874) : W. Townshend (Oxford University)
 Walter Toynbee (1879) : W. T. Toynbee
 George Traill (1864) : G. B. Traill
 Arthur Trevor (1882–1885) : A. H. Trevor (Sussex)
 Frederick Trevor (1864) : F. G. B. Trevor
 Edward Tritton (1866–1875) : E. W. Tritton (Middlesex)
 Richard Tryon (1871) : R. Tryon
 Henry Tubb (1873–1877) : H. Tubb 
 George Tuck (1866–1876) : G. H. Tuck (Cambridge University)
 John Turner (1887) : J. A. Turner (Cambridge University)
 John Turner (1876–1883) : J. Turner 
 Edward Tylecote (1874–1886) : E. F. S. Tylecote (Kent)
 Henry Tylecote (1879–1886) : H. G. Tylecote (South)

U
 John Udal (1871–1875) : J. S. Udal (MCC)
 George Ulyett (1880–1885) : G. Ulyett (Yorkshire)

V
 George Vanderspar (1893) : G. A. H. Vanderspar (MCC)
 Harry Verelst (1868) : H. W. Verelst (Yorkshire)
 George Vernon (1876–1898) : G. F. Vernon (Middlesex)
 Stirling Voules (1865) : S. C. Voules (Oxford University)

W
 James Walker (1883–1892) : J. G. Walker (Middlesex)
 Nesbit Wallace (1885) : N. W. Wallace (Hampshire)
 Edward Wallington (1885) : E. W. Wallington (Oxford University)
 Conrad Wallroth (1871) : C. A. Wallroth (Kent)
 William Walrond (1868) : W. H. Walrond (MCC)
 J. L. Wanklyn (1885) : J. L. Wanklyn (MCC)
 Edward Ward (1871) : E. E. Ward (Cambridge University)
 William Ward (1871) : W. E. Ward (MCC)
 Pelham Warner (1894–1929) : P. F. Warner (Middlesex)
 Frederic Watson (1869–1874) : F. Watson (MCC)
 Charles Weatherby (1882) : C. T. Weatherby (MCC)
 A. J. Webbe (1875–1897) : A. J. Webbe (Middlesex)
 George Webbe (1878) : G. A. Webbe (MCC)
 Herbert Webbe (1877) : H. R. Webbe (Middlesex)
 Gerry Weigall (1894–1926/27) : G. J. V. Weigall (Kent)
 James Welldon (1868) : J. T. Welldon (Kent)
 Tristram Welman (1874–1889) : F. T. Welman (MCC)
 John West (1869–1883) : J. West (Yorkshire)
 William West (1888–1891) : W. A. J. West (MCC)
 Edward Western (1882) : E. Western (Somerset)
 John Wheeler (1877–1887) : J. Wheeler (Leicestershire)
 Lees Whitehead (1890–1903) : L. Whitehead (Yorkshire)
 John Whiteside (1890–1902) : J. P. Whiteside (Leicestershire)
 Herbert Whitfeld (1881–1887) : H. Whitfeld (Sussex)
 Montague Wilde (1881–1883) : T. M. M. Wilde (MCC)
 Anthony Wilkinson (1867–1871) : A. J. A. Wilkinson (Middlesex)
 William Wilkinson (1890) : W. O. C. Wilkinson (MCC)
 Edmund Willes (1866–1867) : E. H. L. Willes (MCC)
 Frederic Willett (1882) : F. S. D. Willett (MCC)
 Billy Wilson (1892–1895) : G. L. Wilson (Sussex)
 Cecil Wilson (1884–1885) : C. Wilson (Kent)
 Leslie Wilson (1893) : L. Wilson (Kent)
 Sidney Wilson (1882) : S. J. Wilson (MCC)
 Thomas Wilson (1869) : T. H. Wilson (Hampshire)
 L. Forbes Winslow (1864) : L. S. F. Winslow (MCC)
 Lyndhurst Winslow (1875) : L. Winslow (Sussex)
 Arthur Winter (1867–1870) : A. H. Winter (MCC)
 Arthur Wood (1880–1881) : A. H. Wood (Hampshire)
 George Wood (1880–1881) : G. H. Wood
 Sammy Woods (1889–1902) : S. M. J. Woods (Somerset)
 William Woof (1882–1885) : W. A. Woof (Gloucestershire)
 Jimmy Wootton (1884–1891) : J. Wootton (Kent)
 Arthington Worsley (1888–1890) : A. Worsley (MCC)
 Charles Wright (1883–1901) : C. W. Wright (Nottinghamshire)
 J. Wright (1882) : J. Wright (MCC)
 Walter Wright (1886) : W. Wright (Nottinghamshire)
 William Wright (1866) : W. H. Wright (MCC)
 George Wyatt (1875–1886) : G. N. Wyatt (MCC)
 Frederick Wyld (1875–1885) : F. Wyld (Nottinghamshire)
 Edward Wynne-Finch (1864–1866) : E. H. Wynne-Finch (MCC)
 Teddy Wynyard (1887–1912) : E. G. Wynyard (Hampshire)

Y
 William Yardley (1870–1873) : W. Yardley (Kent)
 Richard Young (1873) : R. J. C. Young (MCC)

References

Marylebone